Fanatical (formerly Bundle Stars) is a United Kingdom-based online video game retailer. It has sold more than 80 million officially authorised game keys to over two million customers globally.

Fanatical has a catalogue of over 8,000 games from more than 1,000 game publishers and developers. These include direct partnerships with Bethesda Softworks, SEGA, THQ Nordic, Deep Silver, Kalypso Media and Codemasters as well as smaller independent developers.

History

Fanatical was originally launched in 2012 by Focus Multimedia Limited, under the name Bundle Stars. As Bundle Stars, it curated collections of games for the Steam platform at significantly discounted prices.

Bundle Stars relaunched as Fanatical on November 1, 2017, expanding both its product offering and its team. As a digital distribution service, Fanatical offers games, bundles and downloadable content (DLC) for Windows PC, Mac and Linux platforms as well as eBooks, eLearning courses and a variety of other digitally delivered products.

In February 2021, Focus Multimedia Limited was acquired by Fandom, Inc.

References 

Video game companies of the United Kingdom
2012 establishments in England
Companies based in Staffordshire